Stephen Kennedy (born 22 July 1965) is an English former professional footballer who played as a full back for Burnley in the Football League.

References

External links
Steve Kennedy profile at clarets-mad.co.uk

1965 births
Living people
People from Audenshaw
English footballers
Association football defenders
Burnley F.C. players
English Football League players
Footballers from Greater Manchester